Monolinuron is a pesticide, more specifically a selective systemic herbicide and an algaecide. As an herbicide, it is used to control broad-leaved weeds and annual grasses in vegetable crops such as leeks, potatoes, and dwarf French beans. Monolinuron affects the photosynthesis in weeds. Following uptake of monolinuron through roots and leaves of weeds, monolinuron causes early symptoms of yellowing and die-back of the leaves, eventually resulting in weed death. In fishkeeping, it is used to control blanket weed and hair algae.

As a herbicide, it is used in a range of food and non-food crops, e.g. beans and other vegetables, onions, fruits, cereals, potatoes, vines and ornamental plants. It was introduced to use in circa 1965. It is an inhibitor of photosystem II of photosynthesis. It is a derivative of urea and related to paraquat. It is available under various trade names e.g. Monamex, Gramonol, Aresin.

It is soluble in water (0.735 g/L), and very soluble in organic solvents (200 g/L in acetone, methanol, and toluene, 3.9 g/L in hexane). Its volatility is low and its leachability is high. It is moderately persistent and moderately mobile in soil, stable in water, and fast degraded in water sediments (DT50 of 22 days). It has low toxicity for mammals (LD50 oral for a rat is 2100 mg/kg).

References

External links
 

Herbicides
Ureas
Chloroarenes